The 2005 Big Ten softball tournament was held at Alumni Field on the campus of the University of Michigan in Ann Arbor, Michigan, from May 12 through May 14, 2005. The championship game was aired on CSTV. As the tournament winner, Michigan earned the Big Ten Conference's automatic bid to the 2005 NCAA Division I softball tournament.

Format and seeding
The 2005 tournament was an eight team single-elimination tournament. The top eight teams based on conference regular season winning percentage earned invites to the tournament.

Tournament

Schedule

All-Tournament Team
 Designated Player: Kristen Amegin (Northwestern)
 Designated Player: Ricci Robben (Wisconsin)
 Pitcher: Lisa Birocci (Iowa)
 Pitcher: Jennie Ritter (Michigan)
 Catcher: Becky Marx (Michigan)
 First base: Samantha Findlay (Michigan)
 Third base: Grace Leutele (Michigan)
 Shortstop: Stephanie Churchwell (Northwestern)
 Shortstop: Stacy May (Iowa)
 Outfielder: Alessandra Giampaolo (Michigan)
 Outfielder: Stephanie Bercaw (Michigan)
 Outfielder: Sheila McCorkle (Northwestern)

Tournament MVP
 Jessica Merchant (Michigan)

References

Big Ten softball tournament
Tournament
Big Ten softball tournament